Idiomarina seosinensis is a halophilic and motile bacterium from the genus of Idiomarina which has been isolated from hypersaline water from a solar saltern from Seosin in Korea.

References

Bacteria described in 2005
Alteromonadales